The Wizards Return: Alex vs. Alex is a 2013 American television special based on the Disney Channel Original Series Wizards of Waverly Place. It was directed by Victor Gonzalez and filmed primarily in Disney Studios in October and November 2012. The full cast of the series starred in the special, with the exception of David Henrie as Justin Russo, although the character was mentioned frequently. The film focuses on the Russo family, Harper, and Mason visiting Italy for a family reunion. The special premiered on March 15, 2013 on the Disney Channel in the United States, and attracted 5.9 million viewers.

Plot
A year after the family wizard competition, the new family wizard Alex uses her power for both good and bad, but it still upsets her parents who still think she is irresponsible and should be like Justin, who now took over Wiztech. While on a reunion vacation to Tuscany, Italy , Alex decides to change her image for good by ditching all the negative parts of her personality into a clone of herself, but when her clone manages to get a mind of its own and tries to take over the world with magic, Alex has the ultimate face off with herself in order to save the world.

Cast
 Selena Gomez as Alex Russo / Evil Alex, the family wizard of the Russo family who uses her magical abilities irresponsibly and selfishly. Hoping to change for the better, Alex casts a spell on herself making her bad counterparts its own individual person. However, her evil counterpart attempts to take over the world, while her good parts have to stop it. Gomez portrays a dual role in the special.
 Jake T. Austin as Max Russo, Alex's dimwitted younger brother who is now a mortal due to losing the family wizard competition and the new owner of the Sub Station.
 Jennifer Stone as Harper Finkle, Alex's mortal best friend who is aware about her magical abilities.
 Gregg Sulkin as Mason Greybeck, Alex's werewolf boyfriend.
 Beau Mirchoff as Dominic, Gorog's evil nephew who wants to take over the world.
 Maria Canals Barrera as Theresa Russo, Alex and Max's mortal mother who dislikes the use of magic.
 David DeLuise as Jerry Russo, the patriarch of the Russo family, a former family wizard, who loves to correct Alex about her wrongful ways.

Production

Casting
The majority of the cast of the Disney Channel Original Series Wizards of Waverly Place (with the exception of David Henrie as Justin Russo, who was frequently mentioned) starred in the special. It was the first time they all got together to film the last movie for WOWP eight months after the show came to an end.

Filming
The Wizards Return: Alex vs. Alex was filmed at Hollywood Center Studios in California, with background sets for the Italy scenes. The special was filmed from October 22 to November 10, 2012. Unlike Wizards of Waverly Place: The Movie, which was a feature-length television film, this was an hour-long special. It was also the first WOWP content that Disney produced after the finale of the show which was 9 months earlier.

Release
The special premiered on Disney Channel as a TV special on March 15, 2013 in the United States.

Reception
The episode was viewed by 5.9 million viewers on the day of its initial release. In the United Kingdom, the episode premiered with 575,000 viewers making it Disney Channel UK's third most watched episode ever.

Home media
The special was released exclusively on DVD on June 25, 2013 in a release that included the hour-long final episode of Wizards of Waverly Place, "Who Will Be the Family Wizard?" as a bonus feature. The actual special was presented in its original 1.78:1 aspect ratio, with English, Spanish and French audio and subtitle tracks.

See also
 List of Wizards of Waverly Place episodes
 Wizards of Waverly Place: The Movie

References

External links
 

Wizards of Waverly Place
2010s American television specials
2013 television specials